Nicklasson is a Swedish surname. Notable people with this surname include:

Andreas Nicklasson (born 1978), Swedish football player
Daniel Nicklasson (born 1981), Swedish football player
Göran Nicklasson (1942–2018), Swedish football player
Jan Nicklasson (born 1954), Swedish rower
, Swedish musician

Swedish-language surnames